Qingning Township is a township in Jinchuan County, Sichuan, China. , it administers the following three villages:
Qingning Village
Tuanjie Village
Xinsha Village

References 

Township-level divisions of Sichuan
Jinchuan County